Momentum Space is an album by American jazz saxophonist Dewey Redman, pianist Cecil Taylor and drummer Elvin Jones featuring performances recorded in 1998 and released on the Verve label.

Reception

The Allmusic review by Scott Yanow awarded the album 3 stars stating "The music is unpredictable yet not all that unique or colorful and one's expectations for a truly classic affair are not quite reached. This is worth listening to, but is not essential except as a historical curiosity".

Gary Giddins wrote: "This is a considered, committed album—not an autumnal all-star caucus like the Giants of Jazz in the '70s, but a unique and artful collaboration. Even if the music and conceptual organization were less remarkable, this disc would be one for the books."

Writing for All About Jazz, Craig Jolley called the album "a major statement", and commented: "All three major voices influence its sound directly (Taylor) or through collaborators. Participation varies from track to track. Each musician has a solo tune, there are two duets, and all three play on the two longest tunes... The music itself is completely free with no pre-conceived composition, key, or rhythm. Ebb and flow is determined by the players and centers around the rhythm of the moment. Several ambiguously defined themes come and go, most of which seem to emanate from Taylor but become common property."

Track listing
All compositions by Dewey Redman except as indicated
 "Nine" - 10:52 
 "Bekei" (Elvin Jones) - 4:19 
 "Spoonin'" - 7:27 
 "Life as..." (Cecil Taylor) - 8:31 
 "It" (Taylor) - 7:15 
 "Is" (Taylor) - 20:47 
 "Dew" - 0:49 
Recorded at Avatar Recording Studio, New York, New York on August 4 & 5, 1998

Personnel
Dewey Redman - tenor saxophone (tracks 1, 3 & 5-7)
Cecil Taylor - piano (tracks 1 & 4-6)
Elvin Jones - drums (tracks 1-3 & 6)

References

Verve Records albums
Dewey Redman albums
Cecil Taylor albums
Elvin Jones albums
1998 albums